The Syl Apps Athlete of the Year Award, began in 1998 and is awarded by the Ontario Sports Hall of Fame to Ontario's Athlete of the Year. It is named in for Syl Apps, an Olympic and Commonwealth Games pole vaulter and Captain of the Toronto Maple Leafs in the 1940s.

The award is made based on voting by Ontario-based sports writers, broadcasters and personalities who have covered sports in Ontario for at least 10 years, as well as members of the Ontario Sports Hall of Fame Board of Directors and the Hall's Advisory Board. The award is for outstanding and memorable contributions to Ontario sports during the previous calendar year. Athletes may be eligible for the award if they are Ontario-born or Ontario-based.

Online Voting

In 2015, the Ontario Sports Hall of Fame started to poll the public of Ontario to vote online for the next Syl Apps Athlete of the Year award recipient. In its first year, Brooke Henderson was selected by the voters of Ontario as the athlete that best deserved the honour. She received an overwhelming majority of the votes, beating out professional and amateur athletes including Kyle Lowry, Milos Raonic, and Russell Martin.

In 2016, the Ontario Sports Hall of Fame recognized Brad Sinopoli, a Canadian football wide receiver who was playing for the Ottawa Redblacks of the Canadian Football League, as the Syl Apps Athlete of the Year. The online public vote to determine the award recipient concluded on March 31, 2016 with Sinopoli edging out other top professional competitors such as Andre De Grasse, Brooke Henderson and Kadeisha Buchanan to win. He received nearly 30% of total votes cast.

Winners

Key
 * = Voted by the Ontario public in online poll

References

Canadian sports trophies and awards
Sport in Ontario
Ontario awards
Most valuable player awards
Awards established in 1998
1998 establishments in Ontario